In pharmacology, an adjuvant is a drug or other substance, or a combination of substances, that is used to increase the efficacy or potency of certain drugs. Specifically, the term can refer to:

 Adjuvant therapy in cancer management
 Analgesic adjuvant in pain management
 Immunologic adjuvant in vaccines

This is a specialized usage of a word (derived from the Latin verb "adjuvare", to help), which also has a more general meaning as someone or something assisting in any operation or effect.

Adjuvants